Myrto (fl. 5th century BC) was, according to some accounts, a wife of Socrates.

Sources
The original source for the claim that she was Socrates' wife appears to have been a work by Aristotle called On Being Well-Born, although Plutarch expresses doubt that the work is genuine. She was apparently the daughter, or, more probably, the granddaughter of Aristides. A different account of Xanthippe and Myrto is given in Aristoxenus's Life of Socrates written in the latter part of the fourth century BC that Aristoxenus asserts is based on first-person accounts by his father. This claims that Myrto was his legitimate wife and Xanthippe his mistress, whose child became legitimate.

Although Diogenes Laërtius describes Myrto as Socrates' second wife living alongside Xanthippe, Myrto was presumably a common-law wife, and Plutarch describes Myrto as merely living "together with the sage Socrates, who had another woman but took up this one as she remained a widow due to her poverty and lacked the necessities of life." Athenaeus and Diogenes Laërtius report that Hieronymus of Rhodes attempted to confirm the story by pointing to a temporary decree the Athenians passed:

Neither Plato nor Xenophon mention Myrto, and not everyone in ancient times believed the story: according to Athenaeus, Panaetius "refuted those who talk about the wives of Socrates."

Notes

Further reading 

 
 

5th-century BC Athenians
Ancient Athenian women
Family of Socrates
5th-century BC Greek women